VMCA is an abbreviation for
Vmca (Minimum control speed in the take-off configuration, a.k.a. air minimum control speed or minimum control speed in free air) see V speeds. The term and symbol are officially approved by the International Civil Aviation Organization (ICAO) and come from the French « vitesse minimale de contrôle en air libre ».
 Vancouver Métis Community Association
 Veterinary Medical College Application Service
 Veterans for Medical Cannabis Access
 Voluntary Marine Conservation Area